Thomas H. McClelland II (born c. 1981–1982) is the deputy athletic director for external affairs and revenue generation at Vanderbilt University. He was previously the director of athletics for Louisiana Tech University, where he was the youngest athletics director in the FBS. Prior to that role, he served as athletics director of McNeese State University where he was the youngest among all NCAA Division I athletics directors when hired at age 26. He graduated with his bachelor's and master's degrees from Northwestern State University where he lettered in both football and track and field.

In May 2020, while still the Athletic Director at LTU, McClelland gave what quickly became seen as an infamous press conference, in which he responded to a suggestion by Brian Maggard (the AD for the Louisiana Ragin' Cajuns, a member of the Sun Belt Conference) that the two schools schools schedule more games in a effort to reduce costs, capitalize on in-state rivalry, etc.  Mr. McClelland not only rejected this idea, but also went on to insult UL, and then by extension the entire SBC, by stating that the C-USA was a far superior conference. Less than 2 years later the C-USA came close to total collapse, when 6 C-USA schools defected to the AAC conference, while 3 C-USA schools moved to the SBC.

References

External links
 Louisiana Tech profile
 McNeese State profile

Year of birth uncertain
Living people
American football long snappers
American male javelin throwers
Louisiana Tech Bulldogs and Lady Techsters athletic directors
McNeese Cowboys and Cowgirls athletic directors
Northwestern State Demons football players
College men's track and field athletes in the United States
People from Eunice, Louisiana
Players of American football from Louisiana
Year of birth missing (living people)